Amaravati Kathalu is a collection of Telugu short stories written by Satyam Sankaramanchi.

The stories are about the people of the village of Amaravati and were first published in the Andhra Jyothi newspaper. Later on, the stories were published by Navodaya Publishers in the form of a book, which bears art of renowned artist Bapu. The book was re-printed several times. The series ran for two years. They follow a typical Chekhovian style. The stories are heart warming and are about people encounter in their everyday lives.

There are 101 stories in this collection, each one having a simple picture drawn by Bapu. The foreword is by Mullapudi Venkata Ramana. These stories are work of imagination and fiction, and they are inspired by incidents and folk stories related to Amaravati. The stories, along with the pictures drawn by Bapu are considered one of the best Telugu short story collection of 20th century.  This book also won the Andhra Sahitya Academy award in 1979. The stories were dictated by Sankaramanchi to popular All India Radio news reader Prayaga Ramakrishna who wrote down the stories.
Shyam Benegal made a TV serial based on these stories with the name "Amaravati ki Kathayein".

Contents

 వరద (Varada)
 సుడిగుండం లో ముక్కుపుడక (SudiGundam lo MukkuPudaka)
 పుణుకుల బుట్టలో లచ్చి తల్లి (PunkulaButta lo Lacchi Thalli)
 రెండు గంగలు (Rendu Gangalu)
బంగారు దొంగ (Bangaru Donga) 
ముక్కోటి కైలాసం (Mukkoti Kailasam)
ఆరేసిన చీర (Aaresina Cheera)
శివుడు నవ్వాడు (Sivudu Navvadu)
ఒక రోజెల్లిపోయింది (Oka Rojellipoyindi)
హరహర మహాదేవ (Hara Hara Mahadeva)
Dhavali Chirigi Poyindi
రాగిచెంబులో చేప పిల్ల (Raagi Chemubulo Chepa Pilla)
అద్గదిగో బస్సు (Adgagigo Bassu)
పువ్వుల్లేని విగహాలు నవ్వాయి (Puvvulluni Vigrahalu Navvayi)
పందిరి పట్టెమంచం (Pandiripatti Mancham)
అన్నపూర్ణ కావిడి (Annapurna Kavidi)
చెట్టుకొమ్మనున్న కథ (Chettu Kommanunna Katha)
ఆఖరి వెంకటాద్రి నాయుడు (Aakhari Venkatadri Naidu)
ఎవరు పాడినా ఆ ఏడక్షరాలే (Evaru Paadina Aa Edaksharale)
పచ్చగడ్డి భగ్గుమంది (Paccha Gaddi Bhaggumandhi)
లేగదూడ చదువు (Lega Dooda chaduvu) 
అవతలొడ్డు పొంగింది (Avathaloddu Po-ngindi)
మే మే మేక పిల్ల (Me Me Meka Pilla)
కాకితో కబురు (Kakitho kaburu)
తులసి తాంబూలం (Thulasi Thambulam)
భోజన చక్రవర్తి (Bhojana Chakravarthi)
నావెళ్ళి పోయింది (Navellipoyindi)
నీరు నిలవదు (Neeru Nilavadu)
Engila
బాకీ సంగoతి (Baki Sangathi)
మాయ (Maya)
నివేదన (Nivedana)
ధర్మపాలుడు (Dharma Plaudu)
నాన్న-నది (Nanna-Nadi)
కీలుగుర్రం (KeeluGurram)
అచ్చోసిన ఆంబోతు (Acchosina Ambothu)
వయసొచ్చింది (Vasocchindi)
లంకల్ల పుట్టింది లచ్చితల్లి (Lankalla Puttindi LacchiThalli)
ఇద్దరు మిత్రులు (Iddaru Mitrulu)
పున్నాగ వాన (Punnaga vaana)
ఖాళీ కుర్చీ (Khaali Khurchi)
రాజహంస రెక్కలు విప్పింది (RajaHamsa Rekkalu Vippindi)
ఎవరా పోయేది? (Evara Poyedhi?)
ముద్దులల్లుడు (Muddulalludu)
ముద్దేలనయ్యా మనసు నీదైయుండ (Muddelanayya-Manasu needaiyunda)
వంశాంకురం (Vamsaankuram)
బలి (Bali)
అటునుంచి కొట్టుకురండి! (Atunichi Kottukurandi‌)
Manasu Nindukundi
Abaddham-Chedina Aadadhi
Dongalo? Doralo?
Kaanuka (కానుక)
 (తల్లి కడుపు చల్లగా..)
Virigina Pallaki (విరిగిన పల్లకి)
Naa Venaka Evaro (నా వెనక ఎవరో)
Siri-Shanti (సిరి-శాంతి)
Gunde Sivudikicchuko (గుండె శివుడికిచ్చుకో )
Sangamam
Antha Saamidhe.Nenaverni ivvadaniki?
Malli Malli Cheppukune Katha
Ampakam
Nindukunda Bomma
Gaythri
Mouna Sankham
Adugo Alladugo
Appadala Assembly
Matti..Otti Matti..
Velam Saruku
Nilabadagalava
Saakshatkaram
Evariki Cheppamaka
Gnana Kshetram
Eka Kathapithamaha
Trupthi
Aagni Uyyala
Tellavarindhi
Tampulamari somalingam
Edadiko roju puli
Dooranga Saarangadhara
Amavasya veligindi

Sthambhana
Pattuthareeyam
Mrythyorma
Antha Baagane Undi
Deepam-Jyothi
Kuputhro Jaayetha kvachadapi Kumatha Nabhavathi
Poola Sultan
Pakka veedhi Jnmantha Dooram
Tapa Raaledu Bottu Cheragaledu
Bhojananthe
O Naruda! Vaanaruda
Bindu rekha
Nenu Melkone Unnanu
Eduperaganivaadu
Arugarugo Subbayya Maastaru
PranavaMurthy
Seetharamabhyam Namaha
శిఖరం (Sikharam)
మహా రుద్రాభిషేకం (Maha Rudrabhishekam)

References

External links
Amaravati Kathalu - Vol 1. dasubhashitam.com.

Culture of Vijayawada
Telugu-language literature
Indian short story collections
20th-century Indian books